Benedictus Deus may refer to:
Benedictus Deus (Benedict XII), a papal bull of 1336 
Benedictus Deus (Pius IV), a papal bull of 1564
Benedictus Deus (Benedict XIV), a papal bull of 1750

See also 
 Benedictus (disambiguation)